Harry Rogers may refer to:

 Harry Rogers (basketball) (born 1950), former professional basketball player
 Harry Rogers (cricketer) (1889–1956), English first-class cricketer
 Harry Lovejoy Rogers (1867–1925), United States Army officer
 Harry Rogers, fictional character from DC Comics
 Harry Rogers, trainer of 2007's Punchestown Champion Hurdle winner, Silent Oscar

See also
Harold Rogers (disambiguation)
Henry Rogers (disambiguation)